Scott Meenagh (born 16 September 1989) is a British para Nordic skier, who won the 12.5km individual biathlon event at the 2023 World Para Nordic Skiing Championships. He competed at the 2018 and 2022 Winter Paralympics.

Early life and Army career
Meenagh is from Cumbernauld, Scotland. He played rugby union for Scotland under-18s.

Meeangh served in the British Army Parachute Regiment, and was deployed to Afghanistan. In 2011, he lost both of his legs after stepping on an improvised explosive device in Helmand Province. He was rehabilitated at Headley Court, and now uses prosthetic limbs. Meenagh was a spectator of the Paralympic Nordic skiing events at the 2014 Winter Paralympics in Sochi, Russia.

Sports career
Meenagh competed in rowing, and was a captain of the British Army team at the 2014 Invictus Games. He failed to qualify for the 2016 Summer Paralympics.

Meenagh joined the Armed Forces Para Snow Sports team in 2016. Meenagh was selected for the 2018 Winter Paralympics in Pyeongchang, South Korea. He was the first British Nordic skier at a Paralympics for 20 years. He finished 17th in the 15km free cross-country event. In biathlon, he finished 16th in the 7.5km event, 13th in the 12.5km event and 14th in the 15km event.

Meenagh was selected for the 2022 Winter Paralympics. He finished 12th in the 18km classical event, and was part of the first British relay team to finish the 4 × 2.5km relay event at a Paralympics, alongside Steve Arnold, Steve Thomas and Callum Deboys.

Meenagh came second in the 12.5km individual biathlon event at the 2023 World Para Nordic Skiing Championships. He was the first Briton to win a medal at the Championships, and he also finished fourth in the 7.5km individual biathlon event. He was the only British competitor at the Championships.

References

External links
 IPC Profile
 Paralympics GB Profile
 British Rowing Profile

1989 births
Living people
Scottish male biathletes
Scottish male cross-country skiers
Cross-country skiers at the 2018 Winter Paralympics
Biathletes at the 2018 Winter Paralympics
Cross-country skiers at the 2022 Winter Paralympics
Paralympic cross-country skiers of Great Britain
Paralympic biathletes
Scottish Paralympic competitors
British Parachute Regiment soldiers
Sportspeople from North Lanarkshire
People from Cumbernauld
Scottish male rowers